Mets Ayrum is a village in the Lori Province of Armenia. The village was populated by Azerbaijanis before the exodus of Azerbaijanis from Armenia after the outbreak of the Nagorno-Karabakh conflict. Mets Ayrum greatly suffers from the nearby mine dump which causes serious health problems for the villagers and threatens the ecology of the entire area.

Development Programs 
In 2015 some programs started to be implemented in Mets Ayrum by Children of Armenia Fund.

Arts Clubs, Crafts Clubs, Media Literacy Club, Student Councils, English Language Instruction, Social and Psychological Assistance, Support to Children with Learning Difficulties, Health and Lifestyle Education, Women Health Screenings, Support for Reproductive Health were implemented in the village by COAF.

COAF SMART room was renovated in the village school.

References 

Populated places in Lori Province